Democratic Party (Slovakia) may refer to:

 Democratic Party (Slovakia, 1944), existing from 1944 to 1948
 Democratic Party (Slovakia, 1989), existing from 1989 to 2006
 Democratic Party (Slovakia, 2006) (sk), non-parliamentary party existing since 2006